The Mexican Formula 2 championship ran for 12 seasons between 1984 and 1995. In 1996, the championship became known as the Formula 3000 series and ran for 2 years between 1996 and 1997.

External links
 Mexican Formula Two at racingrecords.eu
 Indy Lights Panamericana at racingrecords.eu

Formula Two
Mexican Formula Two champions